Hamre may refer to:

Places
Hamre Township, Beltrami County, Minnesota, a civil township in Minnesota, United States
Hamre, Osterøy, a village in Osterøy municipality in Vestland county, Norway
Hamre (municipality), a former municipality in Vestland county, Norway
Hamre Church, a church in Osterøy municipality in Vestland county, Norway
Hamre, Jammu and Kashmir, a village located in Pattan Tehsil of Baramulla district in India

People
Chad Hamre, the CEO and co-founder of Ethical Ocean - a social business incorporated federally in Canada in 2008
John Hamre, think tank president and former U.S. government official
Knut Hamre, a Norwegian Hardanger fiddle player
Lasse Hamre, a Norwegian alpine skier
Ole Hamre, a Norwegian musician (drums, percussion) and composer
Philip Hamre (1897-1961), an American politician
Sverre B. Hamre, a Norwegian general
Tor Henning Hamre, a former Norwegian football striker